DPZ may refer to:

 Dead Prez, an American hip hop group
 the stock ticker symbol for Domino's Pizza, a multinational pizza chain
 Duany Plater Zyberk & Company, an American architectural firm
 SBB-CFF-FFS Re 450, a Swiss railway locomotive